South Heights station was a commuter train station located in South Heights, Pennsylvania (formerly Shannopin, PA and Ethels Landing, PA) serving the Pittsburgh and Lake Erie Railroad in the late 1890s-early 1900s.  The station was located near the junction of Jordan Street and Hill Street within the Borough limits.  The station was an early stop for the train between the Woodlawn/Aliquippa and Shousetown stations.

External links
Beaver County PA Railroad Stations

Former Pittsburgh and Lake Erie Railroad stations
Pittsburgh metropolitan area
Railway stations in Beaver County, Pennsylvania
1890s establishments in Pennsylvania
1900s disestablishments in Pennsylvania